Red Hot Chili Peppers is an alternative rock band formed in 1983 in Los Angeles, California. Red Hot Chili Peppers have received a total of 25 awards and 65 nominations worldwide throughout their career. These include a total of six Grammy Award wins out of sixteen nominations. 2006's Stadium Arcadium was the band's first album nominated for the Album of the Year Grammy award. Red Hot Chili Peppers have also received 30 nominations for MTV Music Video Awards, including Video of the Year, for the song "Under the Bridge" and in 2000, the Michael Jackson Video Vanguard Award. On August 28, 2022, the band received the Global Icon Award from MTV. Red Hot Chili Peppers and many of their works have had great critical acclaim. Their albums, Blood Sugar Sex Magik, Californication, and By the Way, have both ranked in Rolling Stones 500 Greatest Albums of All Time, placing at 310, 399 and 304, respectively. On March 31, 2022, RHCP was awarded a star on the Hollywood Walk of Fame.

The band currently holds the record for most no.1 singles (15), most cumulative weeks at no.1 (91) and most top 10 songs (28) on the Billboard Alternative Songs chart.

On April 14, 2012, the band was inducted by Chris Rock into the Rock and Roll Hall of Fame. Members inducted were Flea, Chad Smith, John Frusciante, Jack Irons, Anthony Kiedis, Josh Klinghoffer, Cliff Martinez and Hillel Slovak. Klinghoffer became the youngest inductee at 32, passing Stevie Wonder, who was inducted at 38.

American Music Awards
The American Music Awards are awarded annually by a poll of music buyers. Red Hot Chili Peppers have received 4 awards from 7 nominations

|-
|rowspan="2"|1993
|Red Hot Chili Peppers
|Favorite Heavy Metal/Hard Rock Artist
|
|-
|"Under the Bridge"
|Favorite Pop/Rock Single
|
|-
|2000
|Red Hot Chili Peppers
|Favorite Alternative Artist
|
|-
|2001
|Red Hot Chili Peppers
|Favorite Alternative Artist
|
|-
|rowspan="3"|2006
|rowspan="2"|Red Hot Chili Peppers
|Favorite Alternative Artist
|
|-
|Favorite Pop/Rock Band/Duo/Group
|
|-
|Stadium Arcadium
|Favorite Pop/Rock Album
|
|-
|rowspan="3"|2022
|Red Hot Chili Peppers
|Favorite Rock Artist
|
|-
|Unlimited Love
|Favorite Rock Album
|
|-
|"Black Summer"
|Favorite Rock Song
|

Billboard Awards

Billboard Music Awards
The Billboard Music Awards are sponsored by Billboard magazine and are held annually in December. The Red Hot Chili Peppers have received 4 nominations.

|-
| rowspan="4"| 2006
|Stadium Arcadium
|Rock Album of the Year
|
|-
| rowspan="2"| "Dani California"
|Rock Single of the Year
|
|-
|Modern Rock Single of the Year
|
|-
|Red Hot Chili Peppers
|Modern Rock Artist of the Year
|
|-

Billboard Music Video Awards
The Billboard Music Video Awards are sponsored by Billboard magazine. Red Hot Chili Peppers has won 1 nomination.

|-
|2000
|"Californication"
|Best Modern Rock Clip of the Year
|
|-

Blockbuster Entertainment Awards
The Blockbuster Entertainment Awards were held annually from 1994 to 2001 and were sponsored by Blockbuster Inc. Red Hot Chili Peppers have received one nomination.

|-
|align="center"| 2001
|Red Hot Chili Peppers
|Favorite Group - Rock
|
|-

Brit Awards
The Brit Awards are held annually and were created by the British Phonographic Industry. Red Hot Chili Peppers have received 3 awards from 4 nominations.

|-
|2000
|Red Hot Chili Peppers
|International Group
|
|-
|rowspan="2"|2003
|By the Way
|International Album
|
|-
|Red Hot Chili Peppers
|International Group
|
|-
|2007
|Red Hot Chili Peppers
|International Group
|

California Music Awards
Red Hot Chili Peppers have won 2 nominations.

|-
|align="center"| 2003
|By the Way
|Outstanding Pop/Rock Album
|
|-
|align="center"| 2004
|Red Hot Chili Peppers
|California Favorite
|
|-

Clear Top 10 Awards
The Clear Top 10 Awards was one of major music awards in Indonesia based on 75% radio airplay and 25% artist's album sales in Indonesia.

|-
|align="center"| 2003
|Red Hot Chili Peppers
|Amazing International Hitmaker
|
|-

ECHO Awards
The ECHO Music Awards are held annually and are granted by the Deutsche Phono-Akademie.  Red Hot Chili Peppers have received 1 award.

|-
|align="center"| 2007
|Stadium Arcadium
|International Pop/Rock Group of the Year
|
|-

GAFFA Awards

Denmark GAFFA Awards
Delivered since 1991, the GAFFA Awards are a Danish award that rewards popular music by the magazine of the same name.

!
|-
| 1993
| rowspan="2"| Red Hot Chili Peppers
| Band
| 
| style="text-align:center;" rowspan="15"|
|-
| rowspan="3"| 1995
| Foreign Band
| 
|-
| rowspan="2"| One Hot Minute
| Foreign Cover
| 
|-
| Foreign Album
| 
|-
| rowspan="5"| 1999
| rowspan="2"| Red Hot Chili Peppers
| Foreign Band
| 
|-
| 90s Foreign Name
| 
|-
| Californication
| Foreign Band
| 
|-
| rowspan="2"| "Scar tissue"
| Foreign Video
| 
|-
| Foreign Hit
| 
|-
| 2000
| Red Hot Chili Peppers
| Best Foreign Band
| 
|-
| rowspan="2"| 2002
| By the Way
| Best Foreign Album
| 
|-
| By the Way
| Best Foreign Song
| 
|-
| rowspan="3"| 2006
| Red Hot Chili Peppers
| Best Foreign Band
| 
|-
| "Dani California"
| Best Foreign Song
| 
|-
| Stadium Arcadium
| Best Foreign Album
| 
|-
|}

Grammy Awards
The Grammy Awards are awarded annually by the National Academy of Recording Arts and Sciences in the United States. Red Hot Chili Peppers have received 6 awards from 16 nominations.

!
|-
| align="center"| 1991
| "Higher Ground"
| rowspan="2"|Best Rock Vocal Performance by a Duo or Group
| 
|rowspan="2" align="center"|
|-
| rowspan="2" align="center"| 1993
| "Under the Bridge"
| 
|-
|"Give It Away"
|rowspan="2"|Best Hard Rock Performance
|
|align="center"|
|-
|align="center"| 1996
|"Blood Sugar Sex Magik (Live)"
|
| rowspan="3" align="center"| 
|-
| rowspan="3" align="center"| 2000
|Californication
|Best Rock Album
|
|-
|rowspan="2"|"Scar Tissue"
|Best Rock Vocal Performance by a Duo or Group
|
|-
|rowspan="2"|Best Rock Song
|
|align="center"|
|-
| rowspan="2" align="center"| 2001
|rowspan="2"|"Californication"
|
|
|-
|rowspan="2"|Best Rock Vocal Performance by a Duo or Group
|
|align="center"| 
|-
| rowspan="6" align="center"| 2007
| rowspan="3" | "Dani California"
|
| rowspan="6" align="center"|
|-
|Best Rock Song
|
|-
|Best Short Form Music Video
|
|-
| rowspan="3" | Stadium Arcadium
|Album of the Year
|
|-
|Best Boxed or Special Limited Edition Package
|
|-
|rowspan="2"|Best Rock Album
|
|-
|align="center"| 2012
|I'm with You
|
|align="center"| 
|-

Hong Kong Top Sales Music Awards

|-
|align="center"| 2002
|By the Way
|Top 10 Best Selling Foreign Albums
|
|-
|align="center"| 2004
|Greatest Hits
|Top 10 Best Selling Foreign Albums
|
|-
|align="center"| 2006
|Stadium Arcadium
|Top 10 Best Selling Foreign Albums
|
|-

Hungarian Music Awards
The Hungarian Music Awards are handed out annually by the Hungarian Recording Industry Association.

|-
|align="center"|2017
| rowspan=2|The Getaway
| rowspan=2|Best Foreign Pop Album
| 
| 
|-
|align="center"|2018
| 
|

iHeartRadio Music Awards
iHeartRadio Music Awards is a music awards show, founded by iHeartRadio in 2014, to recognize the most popular artists and music over the past year as determined by the network's listeners.

!Ref.
|-
| rowspan=3|2017
| Red Hot Chili Peppers
| Rock Artist of the Year
| 
| rowspan=3|
|-
| rowspan=2|"Dark Necessities"
| Rock Song of the Year
| 
|-
| Alternative Rock Song of the Year
| 
|-
| rowspan=4|2023
| rowspan=3|Red Hot Chili Peppers
| Rock Artist of the Year
| 
| rowspan=4|
|-
| Alternative Artist of the Year
| 
|-
| Best Duo/Group of the Year
| 
|-
| "Black Summer"
| Rock Song of the Year
| 
|-

Juno Awards
The Juno Award are held annually to Canadian Music artists to acknowledge their artistic and technical achievements in all aspects of music. Red Hot Chili Peppers has received 2 nominations.

|-
|1993
|Red Hot Chili Peppers
|International Entertainer of the Year
|
|-
|2007
|Stadium Arcadium
|International Album of the Year
|

Hungarian Music Awards
The Hungarian Music Awards is the national music awards of Hungary, held every year since 1992 and promoted by Mahasz.

|-
| 2017
| rowspan=2|The Getaway
| Modern Pop/Rock Album of the Year 
| 
|-
| 2018
| Pop/Rock Album of the Year 
|

Kerrang! Awards
The Kerrang! Awards is an annual awards ceremony held by Kerrang!, a British rock magazine. Red Hot Chili Peppers has received 3 nominations.

|-
|align="center"| 2003
|Red Hot Chili Peppers
|Best International Band
|
|-
| rowspan="2" align="center"| 2004
|Red Hot Chili Peppers
|Best Band on the Planet
|
|-
|Red Hot Chili Peppers
|Best Live Band
|
|-

Meteor Ireland Music Awards
The Meteor Ireland Music Awards are held annually and are presented by MCD Productions. Red Hot Chili Peppers has received 4 awards.

|-
|align="center"| 2002
|Red Hot Chili Peppers
|Best Performance by a Visiting Act
|
|-
| rowspan="2" align="center"|2003
|By the Way
|Best International Album
|
|-
|Lansdowne Road
|Best Visiting Live Performance
|
|-
|align="center"| 2004
|Slane Castle
|Best Live Performance
|
|-

MOJO Awards

MOJO Awards are awarded by the popular British music magazine, Mojo, published monthly by Bauer.

|-
| 2004
| Red Hot Chili Peppers
| Maverick Award
|

MTV Australia Video Music Awards
The MTV Australia Video Music Awards are awarded annually since 2004 and are presented by MTV. Red Hot Chili Peppers has received 1 award from 2 nominations.

|-
| rowspan="2" align="center"| 2007
|Stadium Arcadium
|Album of the Year
|
|-
|Red Hot Chili Peppers
|Best Group
|
|-

MTV Europe Music Awards
The MTV Europe Music Award were established in 1994 by MTV Europe to celebrate the most popular music videos in Europe.

|-
|rowspan="2"|1999
|Californication
|Best Album
|
|-
|Red Hot Chili Peppers
|Best Rock
|
|-
|2000
|Red Hot Chili Peppers
|Best Rock
|
|-
|rowspan="2"|2002
|rowspan="2"|Red Hot Chili Peppers
|Best Rock
|
|-
|Best Live Act
|
|-
|rowspan="4"|2006
|rowspan="2"|Red Hot Chili Peppers
|Best Group
|
|-
|Best Rock
|
|-
|"Dani California"
|Best Song
|
|-
|Stadium Arcadium
|Best Album
|
|-
|rowspan="2"|2011
|rowspan="2"|Red Hot Chili Peppers
|Best Rock
|
|-
|Best Live Act
|
|-
|2012
|Red Hot Chili Peppers
|Best World Stage Performance
|
|-
|2016
|Red Hot Chili Peppers
|Best Rock
|
|-
|2022
|Red Hot Chili Peppers
|Best Rock
|

MTV Video Music Awards
The MTV Video Music Award were established in 1984 by MTV to celebrate the music videos of the year. Red Hot Chili Peppers have won 8 awards from 30 nominations. They also have received the 2000 Michael Jackson Video Vanguard Award and the 2022 Global Icon Award.

|-
|rowspan="3"|1990
|rowspan="3"|"Higher Ground"
|Breakthrough Video
|
|-
|Best Post-Modern Video
|
|-
|Best Group Video
|
|-
|rowspan="9"|1992
|rowspan="6"|"Give it Away"
|Best Art Direction in a Video
|
|-
|Breakthrough Video
|
|-
|Best Alternative Video
|
|-
|Best Cinematography in a Video
|
|-
|Best Direction in a Video
|
|-
|Best Editing in a Video
|
|-
|rowspan="3"|"Under the Bridge"
|Video of the Year
|
|-
|Best Group Video
|
|-
|Viewer's Choice
|
|-
|1996
|"Warped"
|Best Editing in a Video
|
|-
|1999
|www.redhotchilipeppers.com
|Best Artist Website
|
|-
|rowspan="6"|2000
|rowspan="5"|"Californication"
|Best Art Direction in a Video
|
|-
|Best Direction in a Video
|
|-
|Best Group Video
|
|-
|Best Special Effects in a Video
|
|-
|Video of the Year
|
|-
|Red Hot Chili Peppers
|Michael Jackson Video Vanguard Award
|
|-
|2002
|"By the Way"
|Best Direction in a Video
|
|-
|rowspan="7"|2006
|rowspan="7"|"Dani California"
|Best Art Direction in a Video
|
|-
|Video of the Year
|
|-
|Best Group Video
|
|-
|Best Rock Video
|
|-
|Best Cinematography in a Video
|
|-
|Best Direction in a Video
|
|-
|Best Editing in a Video
|
|-
|rowspan="3"|2022
|"Black Summer"
|Best Rock
|
|-
|rowspan="2"|Red Hot Chili Peppers
|Group of the Year
|
|-
|Global Icon Award
|

MTV Video Music Awards Japan
The MTV Video Music Awards Japan are held annually since its formation in 2002. Red Hot Chili Peppers has received 3 nominations

|-
| rowspan="3" align="center"| 2007
|Stadium Arcadium
|Best Album of the Year
|
|-
| rowspan="2"| "Dani California"
|Best Video of the Year
|
|-
|Best Group Video
|
|-
| 2012
| "The Adventures of Rain Dance Maggie"
| rowspan="2" | Best Rock Video
| 
|-
| 2016
| "Dark Necessities"
|

MTV Video Music Awards Latin America
The MTV Video Music Awards Latin America are held annually and are broadcast by MTV.  Red Hot Chili Peppers has received 1 award from 2 nominations.

|-
|align="center"| 2002
| rowspan="2"| Red Hot Chili Peppers
| rowspan="2"| Best Rock Artist, International
|
|-
|align="center"| 2006
|
|-

mtvU Woodie Awards
The mtvU Woodie Awards are awarded annually and are broadcast by mtvU. Red Hot Chili Peppers has received 1 nomination.

|-
|align="center"| 2006
|Red Hot Chili Peppers
|Alumni Woodie
|
|-

MuchMusic Video Awards
The MuchMusic Video Awards are awarded annually presented by the Canadian music video channel MuchMusic. Red Hot Chili Peppers has received 1 award from 5 nominations.

|-
| rowspan="2" align="center"|2000
| rowspan="2"| "Californication"
|Favorite International Group
|
|-
|Best International Video
|
|-
|align="center"| 2006
| rowspan="3"| "Dani California"
|Best International Group
|
|-
| rowspan="2" align="center"| 2007
|Best International Video - Group
|
|-
|People's Choice: Favorite International Group
|
|-

My VH1 Music Awards
The My VH1 Music Awards were awarded annually from 2000-2001 presented by Vh1. Red Hot Chili Peppers has received 2 awards from 7 nominations.

|-
| rowspan="2" align="center"|2000 
|"Otherside"
|Video of the Year
|
|-
|"Otherside"
|Song of the Year
|
|-
| rowspan="5" align="center"|2001 
| rowspan="3"| Red Hot Chili Peppers
|Best Stage Spectacle
|
|-
|Best Live Act
|
|-
|Group of the Year
|
|-
|Californication
|Must-Have Album
|
|-
|"Californication"
|Pushing the Envelope Video
|
|-

Nickelodeon Kids' Choice Awards
The Nickelodeon Kids' Choice Awards are awarded annually by Nickelodeon. Red Hot Chili Peppers has received 2 nominations.

|-
|align="center"| 2001
| rowspan="2"| Red Hot Chili Peppers
| rowspan="2"| Favorite Band/Group
|
|-
|2007
|
|-

NRJ Awards

NRJ Music Awards
The NRJ Music Awards are awarded annually by the radio station NJR. Red Hot Chili Peppers have received 1 nomination.

|-
|align="center"| 2007
|Stadium Arcadium
|Best International Album of the Year
|
|-

NRJ Radio Awards
Red Hot Chili Peppers has received 3 awards.

|-
| rowspan="2" align="center"| 2001
|"Otherside"
|Best International Song
|
|-
| rowspan="2"| Red Hot Chili Peppers
| rowspan="2"| Best International Group
|
|-
|align="center"| 2003
|
|-

People's Choice Awards, USA
The People's Choice Awards are held annually to recognize people in pop culture. Red Hot Chili Peppers has received two nominations.

|-
|align="center"| 2007
|Red Hot Chili Peppers
|Favorite Group
|
|-
|align="center"| 2012
|Red Hot Chili Peppers
|Favorite Band
|
|-

Premios 40 Principales 

|-
| 2006
| Red Hot Chili Peppers
| Mejor Artista Internacional
|
|-
|}

Q Awards
The Q Awards are the United Kingdom's music awards run by the British magazine, Q. Red Hot Chili Peppers has received 1 award from 4 nominations.

|-
| rowspan="2" align="center"| 2004
| rowspan="4"| Red Hot Chili Peppers
|Best Act in the World
|
|-
| rowspan="2"| Best Live Act
|
|-
| rowspan="2" align="center"| 2006
|
|-
|Best Act in the World Today
|
|-

Radio Music Awards
The Radio Music Awards are held annually to award the most successful song on mainstream radio. Red Hot Chili Peppers has received 1 nomination.

|-
| align="center"| 2005
|Red Hot Chili Peppers
|Artist of the Year/Alternative and Active Rock Radio
|
|-

Teen Choice Awards
The Teen Choice Awards are held annually and presented by Fox Broadcasting Company. Red Hot Chili Peppers has received 1 nomination.

|-
|2005
|Red Hot Chili Peppers
|Choice Music: Rock Group
|
|-

TMF Awards (Belgium)
The TMF Awards (Belgium) are held annually and broadcast live on TMF. Red Hot Chili Peppers has received 1 award.

|-
|align="center"| 2007
|"Dani California"
|Best Rock International
|
|-

World Music Awards
The World Music Awards are held annually that honors worldwide sales figures. Red Hot Chili Peppers has received 1 nomination.

|-
|align="center"| 2006
|Red Hot Chili Peppers
|World's Best Rock Group
|
|-

Žebřík Music Awards

!Ref.
|-
| rowspan=3|1995
| One Hot Minute
| Best International Album
| 
| rowspan=4|
|-
| "My Friends"
| Best International Song
| 
|-
| "Warped"
| Best International Video
| 
|-
| 1996
| rowspan=3|Themselves
| Best International Enjoyment
| 
|-
| rowspan=7|1999
| Best International Group
| 
| rowspan=24|
|-
| Best International Surprise
| 
|-
| Anthony Kiedis
| Best International Male
| 
|-
| Flea
| Best International Instrumentalist
| 
|-
| Californication
| Best International Album
| 
|-
| "Scar Tissue"
| rowspan=3|Best International Song
| 
|-
| "Otherside"
| 
|-
| rowspan=5|2000
| rowspan=2|"Californication"
| 
|-
| Best International Video
| 
|-
| Californication
| Best International Album
| 
|-
| Flea
| Best International Instrumentalist
| 
|-
| rowspan=3|Themselves
| rowspan=3|Best International Group
| 
|-
| 2001
| 
|-
| rowspan=8|2002
| 
|-
| By the Way
| Best International Album
| 
|-
| rowspan=2|"By the Way"
| Best International Song
| 
|-
| rowspan=2|Best International Video
| 
|-
| rowspan=2|"The Zephyr Song"
| 
|-
| Best International Song
| 
|-
| rowspan=3|Anthony Kiedis
| Best International Personality
| 
|-
| rowspan=2|Best International Male
| 
|-
| rowspan=3|2003
| 
|-
| "Otherside"
| Best International Video
| 
|-
| rowspan=2|Themselves
| rowspan=2|Best International Group
| 
|-
| 2004
| 
|

Other awards

References

Awards
Red Hot Chili Peppers